"Any Ol' Sunday" is a song written by Alfred McCrary and Linda McCrary of the family group, The McCrarys and released on their 1980 Capitol Records album, Just for You. A cover version by Chaka Khan was released as a single the following year as "Any Old Sunday" on the Warner Brothers album, What Cha' Gonna Do for Me. Chaka Khan's version was a hit on Billboard's R&B chart.

Legacy
After three decades since its initial release, the song continues to be popular.  Chaka Khan's version has been re-issued in various compilations.  This includes the 2005 Warner Brothers Special Projects release, Natural High 4.

Personnel
Original Version:
Linda McCrary – vocal
Howard McCrary – Fender Rhodes
Charles W. Creath – Hammond B-3
George Sopuch – guitar
Derrick Schofield and Bill Maxwell – drums
Welton Gite – bass
Randy Brecker – Flugelhorn solo
Paulinho DaCosta – percussion
Patrick Henderson – producer

Chaka Khan Version:
Chaka Khan – vocal
Arif Mardin – producer

References

1981 singles
Chaka Khan songs
Warner Records singles
1980 songs